N41 may refer to:

 N41 (Long Island bus)
 N41 (nebula), in the Large Magellanic Cloud
 , a submarine of the Royal Navy
 London Buses route N41
 Nebraska Highway 41, in the United States
 Waterbury Airport (Connecticut), in Plymouth, Connecticut, United States